Mammillaria heyderi is a species of cactus in the tribe Cacteae. It is endemic to Sonora and Chihuahua in Mexico and New Mexico, Arizona, and Texas in the United States.

References

External links
 Mammillaria heyderi at Tropicos

Plants described in 1848
heyderi